Piotr Piekarski (born 26 June 1993) is a Polish professional footballer who plays as a midfielder for Chełmianka Chełm.

External links
 
 90minut.pl profile

1993 births
Living people
Polish footballers
Association football defenders
Poland youth international footballers
Ekstraklasa players
Motor Lublin players
GKS Bełchatów players
Polonia Warsaw players
Bruk-Bet Termalica Nieciecza players
Avia Świdnik players
Chełmianka Chełm players
Pelikan Łowicz players
I liga players
III liga players
Sportspeople from Lublin